Ionopsidium acaule is a species of flowering plant in the crucifer family Brassicaceae, endemic to coastal Portugal, specifically from Nazaré to Sagres. It inhabits wet sandy substrates, in clearings of junipers, pine forests and other xerophytic scrub. Sometimes semi-ruderal on roadsides. More rarely, on calcareous or basaltic-derived soils.

References

Brassicaceae
Endemic flora of Portugal
Endemic flora of the Iberian Peninsula